Peshert (also Romanized as Pashret and  Peshrat; also known as Pishirt) is a village in Poshtkuh Rural District, Chahardangeh District, Sari County, Mazandaran Province, Iran. At the 2006 census, its population was 184, in 42 families.

References 

Populated places in Sari County